Municipal elections were held in Israel on 28 October 2003.

By municipality

Abu Ghosh 
Candidate Salim Jaber defeated Iosef Ibrahim in the city's Mayoral Election, with Jaber winning 54.11% to Ibrahim's 45.89%. Ibrahim's electoral list won more votes than Jaber's, but the two lists won an equal number of seats (four). a third list won one seat.

Composition of the City Council:

 United Abu Ghosh - Headed by Iosef Ibrahim - 4 Seats
 Development and Equality - Headed by Samil Jaber - 4 seats
 List for Progress and Promotion - 1 seat

Even Yehuda 
Former head of the Israel Prison Service, Amos Azani, defeated rival candidate Karen Katzman, following Avraham Harari's decision to withdraw from the race.

Composition of the City Council:

 Another Way with Amos Azani - 4 Seats
 Karen Katzman for the leadership of the council (Ken) - 2 seats
 Likud led by Avraham Harari - 2 Seats
 Even Yehuda is ours (Mafdal) - 1 Seat

Shinui, Shas and One Even Yehuda did not pass the city council's Electoral threshold.

Umm al-Fahm 
Candidate Hashem Mahajna defeated Sayyid Aghbariyya after Iosef Mahamid and his list withdrew from the race. Mahajna won 75.06% of the vote while Aghbariyya won 24.94% of the vote. neither candidate's electoral list passed the city council's electoral threshold

Composition of the City Council:

 Alkutla Alaslamiyya - 11 Seats
 Althaluf Alwattani Al-Baladi - 4 Seats

Alayiman (Hashem Mahajna's list) and Balad (Sayyid Aghbariyya's list) did not cross the electoral threshold. two lists withdrew from the election, Umm al-Fahm al-Mustakbal and Thalef al-Mustaklin (led by Iosef Mahamid).

Ofakim 
Incumbent Mayor Yair Hazan, who ran under an independent list supported by the Likud, was defeated by the municipal chairman of the Likud, Avi Asraf, Ya'akov Abada also ran for the Mayorship. Hazan won 40.37% of the vote, Asraf won 43.06%, while Abada won 16.58%. in the city council, the largest party was the Community Torah List (Degel HaTorah), while Yair Hazan's party fell to second place, with the likud winning a single seat. Ya'akov Abada's list won no seats.

Composition of the City Council:

 Torah Community - for Ahi (Degel HaTorah) - 2 Seats
 Ofakim Beiteinu - 2 seats
 Shas - 2 seats
 One Ofakim - 1 seat
 Likud led by Avi Asraf - 1 Seat
 Mafdal - 1 seat
 Community - 1 seat
 Yahad - 1 seat

The following lists did not cross the City Council's electoral threshold: Light in Ofek, Revolution, New Ofek and Shiluv (led by Ya'akov Abada).

Oranit 
Several settlements in Judea and Samaria held municipal elections for the first time in 2003, including Oranit.

Zvi Ma-Yafit narrowly defeated Dov Rozen by a margin of 20 votes. Shimon Adri and Roni Shemer also ran. Ma-Yafit won 45.23% of the vote, Rozen won 44.4%, Adri won 6.47% and Shemer won 3.9%.

Composition of the City Council:

 Oranit Ma-Yafit (Zvi Ma-Yafit's list) - 4 Seats
 Dov Rozen list - 4 Seats
 Adri Shimon list - 1 Seat

The Yachad list, led by Roni Shemer, did not pass the City Council's electoral threshold.

Ezor 
Incumbent Mayor Amnon Zach was re-elected as mayor with support from left-winning parties and the city's Haredi electoral list. he was challenged by the municipal leader of the Likud, Uriel Tan'ami, as well as Zion Hava and Navon Katsav. Zach won 48.51% of the vote, Tan'ami won 25.03% of the vote, hava won 14.73% of the vote and Katsav won 11.73% of the vote.

Composition of the City Council:

 Labor - One Nation - Meretz (led by Amon Zach) - 4 Seats
 Likud (led by Uriel Tan'ami) - 3 Seats
 Our Ezor (led by Zion Hava) - 1 Seat
 United Religious Front (Shas-Mafdal) - 1 Seat
 Alternative (led by Navon Katsav) - 1 Seat
 Judaism with a Soul (United Torah Judaism) - 1 Seat

Elyakhin 
Incumbent Mayor Gideon Hamami defeated the municipal leader of the Likud, Zarah Yehuda, following David Hamami's withdrawal from the race. Hamami won 54.52% of the vote while Yehuda won 45.48%

Composition of the City Council:

 Independent Elyakhin (led by Gideon Hamami)  -2 Seats
 Mafdal - 2 Seats
 Shas - 1 Seat
 Likud - 1 Seat
 Shinui - 1 Seat

Yachad (led by David Hamami) did not cross the City Council's electoral threshold.

Be'er Ya'akov 
Likud candidate Nissim Gozlan defeated Iosef Omid and Avraham Buskila. Gozlan won 66.67% of the vote, Omid won 32.66%, and Buskila won 0.67%

Composition of the City Council:

 Likud (led by Nissim Gozlan) - 4 Seats
 Haredi Front (Shas - Agudat Yisrael, led by Avraham Buskila) - 2 Seats
 Mafdal - 2 Seats
 There is another way (led by Iosef Omid) - 1 Seat

Beersheba 
Incumbent mayor Yaakov Turner was re-elected, he faced Likud Candidate Andrey Ozen, and Zvi Fogel, in addition to Moshe Borochov, City Councillor Ohev Shalom, Iosef Sechtman, and Yael Magen. YTurner won around 48% of the vote, Ozen won 16.7%, Borochov won 5.11%, Sechtman won 3.51% and Magen won 2.82%.

Ruvik Danilovich, who led Kadima Beersheba in the city council election, later became the city's mayor.

Composition of the City Council:

 Kadima Beersheba (led by Ruvik Danilovich) - 7 Seats
 One Beersheba (supported by Labor and led by Ya'akov Turner)
 Religious Union (Shas-Mafdal-United Torah Judaism) - 4 Seats
 Beersheba Beitenu (Yisrael Beiteinu, led by Moshe Borochov) - 2 Seats
 Likud (led by Andrey Ozen) - 2 Seats
 Beersheva in the lead - Shinui (led by Tsvika Fogel) - 2 Seats
 Beersheba is Ours - 1 Seat
 Path of the South (Zecharia Ohev Shalom) - 1 Seat
 A Step into the Future - 1 Seat

Alternative (led by Iosef Sechtman), Renewal (led by Yael Magen), the Camp of Justice (Meretz), Sachar, the New Hope and Nahal 2003 did not cross the City Council's electoral threshold.

Bnei Ayish 
Incumbent Mayor Mark Bessin was re-elected to a second term. he faced Yitzhak ben-Yitzhak and Boris Gorman. Bessin won 60.92% of the vote, ben-Yitzhak won 24.16% and Gorman won 14.91%

Composition of the City Council:

 Our One Home Bnei Ayish (Yisrael Beitenu, led by Mark Bessin) - 5 Seats
 Likud (led by Yitzhak Ben-Yitzhak) - 2 Seats
 Promotion (also known as Kidum, led by Boris Gorman) - 1 Seat

Givatayim 
Incumbent mayor since 1993, Ephraim (Ephi) Stenzler, was re-elected. he faced Iosef Zarzevski and Talia Argaman. Stenzler won 55.88% of the vote, Zarzevski won 23.64% of the vote, and Argaman won 20.48% of the vote. Stenzler later resigned as mayor in 2006.

Composition of the City Council:

 Labor (led by Ephi Stenzler) - 5 Seats
 Likud (led by Talia Argaman) - 3 Seats
 Believe in Givatayim (Mafdal) - 2 Seats
 It will be good in Givatayim (Iosef Zarzevski) - 2 Seats
 Only Givatayim - 2 Seats
 Shinui - 1 Seat
 Meretz - 1 Seat
 Givatayim's youths - 1 Seat

Herzliya 
Incumbent mayor Yael German was re-elected. she faced Yehuda Urieli, Daniel Falti, Urit Rashafi, Uzi Lev-Zur, Harel Nissinov, and Yossi Givati. German won around 56% of the vote, Urieli won around 23%, Falti won 5.49% of the vote, Rashafi won 5.03%, Lev-Zur won 5.01%, Nissinov won 3.62% and Givati won 1.56%.

Composition of the City Council:

 Our Herzliya led by Yael German (supported by Meretz) - 6 Seats
 Mafdal-United Torah Judaism - 2 Seats
 West Herzliya - 2 Seats
 Herzliya deserves more led by Yehuda Arieli - 2 Seats
 Shas - 2 Seats
 Sunshine and the Greens - 1 Seat
 Renewing Labor (Labor Party) - 1 Seat
 Shinui - 1 Seat
 Likud (led by Uzi Lev-Zur) - 1 Seat
 Atid - 1 Seat

Parent committees in Herzliya (led by Harel Nissinov), Herzliya for its Citizens, Herzliya returns to lead (Daniel Falti), Urit Rashafi for Mayor, and the list of 'Givati has an advantage in Experience' did not cross the City Council's electoral threshold.

Holon 
Incumbent Mayor Moti Sasson was re-elected, defeating Yoel Yeshuron. Sasson won 58.54% while Yeshuron won 41.46%

Composition of the City Council:

 Truth led by Moti Sasson (Labor Party) - 7 Seats
 Shas - 5 Seats
 Likud (led by Yoel Yeshuron) - 4 Seats
 Holon Beitenu (Yisrael Beitenu) - 2 Seats
 Shinui - 2 Seats
 Amos Yerushalmi List - 1 Seat
 Meretz - 1 Seat
 Greens - 1 Seats
 Mafdal - 1 Seats
 Social Camp - 1 Seat (Supported by One Nation)

The Holon List led by Moshe Rom, who served as the city's mayor between 1989 and 1993, did not pass the City Council's Electoral Threshold.

Haifa 
Shinui Candidate Yona Yahav was elected mayor, becoming the city's first mayor not to be born in Haifa and not to run as a member of the Labor Party. he defeated Shmuel Arad Shagraf, Aryeh Blitnetel, and Shimon Ohion. Yahav won 51.8% of the vote, Shagraf won 42% of the vote, Blitnetel won 3% and Ohion won 1.5% of the vote.

Composition of the City Council:

 Our Haifa - (supported by Shinui) - 6 Seats
 Likud-One Nation - 5 Seats
 The Citizen is in First Priority - list of Youths, the Elderly, and Women (Labor Party) - 3 Seats
 Hadash - 2 seats
 Mafdal - 2 seats
 Shas - 2 seats
 Yachad (Originated from Yisrael BaAliyah) - 2 Seats
 Haifa Beitenu (Yisrael Beitenu) - 2 Seats
 Kiryat Haim Only (led by Eliezer Kulas) - 2 Seats
 United Torah Judaism (led by Yehuda Aryeh Blitnetel) - 1 Seat
 Meretz - Haifa in the heart - Dor Shalom - Meimad - 1 Seat
 Green Haifan Group - 1 Seat
 Balad - 1 Seats
 Citizens of the City - 1 Seat

Altalena (led by Shimon Ohion), the Greens, Light for the Neighborhoods and "Push" did not cross the City Council's electoral threshold.

Jerusalem 

Candidate Uri Lupolianski defeated Nir Barkat, and became Jerusalem's mayor. he also defeated Yigal Amadi, Larissa Gerstein and Roni Aloni. Lupolianski received 51% of the vote and around 99,000 votes while Barkat received around 74.500 votes, and 42.7% of the vote.

Composition of the City Council:

 United Torah Judaism - 9 Seats
 Jerusalem Will Succeed - 9 Seats
 Shas - 5 Seats
 Mafdal - 4 Seats
 Meretz - 3 Seats
 Shinui - 2 Seats
 Likud - 2 Seats

The Labor Party and One Nation did not cross the City Council's electoral threshold.

Kfar Vradim 
Ron Moskovich defeated Hanan Hen and Reuven Malach. Moskovich won 54.47% of the vote, Hen won 35.53%, and Malach won 10% of the vote.

Composition of the City Council:

 Ram in motion (led by Ron Moskovich) - 4 Seats
 Tomer - Citizens are Satisfied - 3 Seats
 Yachad (led byHanan Hen) - 2 Seats

More (led by Reuven Malach) did not cross the City Council's electoral threshold.

Kfar Yona 
Incumbent head of the Regional council since 1977 Effi Deri defeated six other candidates. Israela Rozen, Yitzhak Dov, Avishai Bar'am, Rafael Eliya, Haim Mor, and Aaron Halfon. Deri won 42.11% of the vote, Rozen won 21.4%, Dov won 18.42%, Bar'am won 10.88%, Eliya 2.96%, Mor 2.83%, and Halfon 1.39%

Composition of the Regional Council:

 One Kfar Yona led by Effi Deri - 3 Seats
 Led by Avi Ben Simon - 2 Seats
 Local List led by Israela Rosen - 2 Seats
 Shinui (led by Avishai Bar'am) - 1 Seat
 New Way (led by Yitzhak Dov) - 1 Seat
 Shas - 1 Seat
 Movement for the Welfare of Citizens - 1 Seat

Mafdal, New life in Kfar Yona (led by Haim Mor and supported by One Nation), Likud (led by Aaron Halfon) and the National Union (led by Rafael Eliya) did not cross the Regional Council's electoral threshold.

Migdal HaEmek 
Incumbent mayor Eliyahu Barada was re-elected, defeating Golan Mashali, Amos Galam, and Eliezer Sa'ada. Barada won 57.54% of the vote, Mashali won 22.48%, Galam won 16.59% and Sa'ada won 3.39%.

Composition of the City Council

 Migdal HaEmek Beitenu (Yisrael Beitenu) - 3 Seats
 Shas - 3 Seats
 Mafdal - 2 Seats
 Likud (led by Eliyahu Barada) - 2 Seats
 Shinui - for the Generation (led by Golan Mashali) - 2 Seats
 Yachad-One Nation (led by Amos Galam) - 2 Seats
 Oz - 1 Seat

Labor (led by Eliezer Sa'ada) the Hai Movement, and Together Hiloni-Religious did not cross the City Council's electoral threshold.

Ma'alot-Tarshiha 
Incumbent mayor since 1976, Shlomo Bohbot, was re-elected as Mayor. defeating Dan Tseyzler and Lior Lassri. Bohbot won 59.61% of the vote, Tseyzler won 25.35% and Lassri won 15.04%.

Composition of the City Council:

 Our Ma'a lot-Tarshiha led by Shlomo Bohbot - 5 Seats
 Together - 2 Seats
 Ma'a lot Religious Front (Mafdal-Shas) - 2 Seats
 Balad - 2 Seats
 Ma'a lot Beitenu (Yisrael Beitenu) - 2 Seats
 Traction (led by Dan Tseyzler) - 1 Seats

Alternative (led by Lior Lassri), Brotherhood and Cooperation, the Movement for Change and Rehabilitation, Tarshiha Al'Mustakabal, Shinui - Change in Ma'a lot-Tarshiha and Mada did not cross the City Council's electoral threshold.

Nahariya 
Incumbent mayor since 1989, Jackie Sabag, was defeated by Ron Promer. Promer also defeated Eyal Eli. Sabag won 45.74% of the vote, Promer won 53.06% and Eli won 1.21%. in 2005, the Haifa Regional District Court declared the election void and called for another election after it was determined that some of Promer's agreements with other parties were illegal.

Composition of the City Council:

 Only Nahariya led by Ron Promer - 6 Seats
 Nahariya One led by Jackie Sabag - 5 Seats
 Change for Nahariya (Shinui) - 1 Seat
 Likud - 1 Seat
 Or (supported by Degel HaTorah) - 1 Seat
 Our Nahariya - 1 Seat
 Tsalash - 1 Seat
 Shas - 1 Seat

A Hand for Nahariya and Together Nahariya in the heart (led by Eyal Eli) did not cross the City Council's electoral threshold.

Nazareth Illit 
Incumbent Mayor Menachem Ariev was re-elected to a seventh term. he faced Ronen Flot and Nissim Akuka. Candidate Raid Gtas withdrew from the race. Ariev won 48.02% of the vote, Flot won 38.37% and Akuka won 13.61% of the vote.

Composition of the City Council:

 One Nazareth Illit led by Menachem Ariev (suppored by Labor) - 5 Seats
 Likud (led by Ronen Flot) - 5 Seats
 National Union-Yisrael Beitenu (led by Lia Shemtov) - 3 Seats
 To My city with Love led by Nissim Akuka - 2 Seats
 Shinui - 1 seat
 Basad Together - 1 Seat

United Nazareth Illit, the Co-Existence list, Partnership, Shas and the Aladla List did not cross the City Council's electoral threshold.

Nesher 
Incumbent Mayor David Amar was re-elected as mayor, defeating Avraham Binmo. Amar won 70.23% of the vote and Binmo won 29.77%

Composition of the City Council:

 Likud (led by David Amar) - 3 Seats
 Greens for Nesher (led by Avraham Binmo) - 3 Seats
 Nesher Plus - 1 Seat
 Shinui - 1 Seat
 National Religious Front (Mafdal - United Torah Judaism) - 1 Seat
 Nesher Beitenu (Yisrael Beitenu) - 1 Seat
 Shas - 1 Seat
 Aliyah our Hope (supported by One Nation) - 1 Seat
 One Nesher (supported by Labor) - 1 Seat

Savyon 
Incumbent Head of the local council Romamya Halevi-Segal defeated former Councillor Marsha Caspi. future Head of the council Motti Landau was first elected to the council as a member of the Traction list. Halevi-Segal won 82.14% of the vote, whole Caspi won 17.86%.

Composition of the Regional Council:

 Our Savyon (Romamya Halevi-Segal) - 3 Seats
 Future (led by Moshik Lipats) - 2 Seats
 Traction - 2 Seats
 There is a Union - 1 Seat
 Loyalists of Savyon (led by Marsha Caspi) - 1 Seat

No list failed to cross the council's electoral threshold.

Acre 
After incumbent Mayor Shmariyau Biran decided not to seek re-election, six candidates registered to run for Mayor. three candidates (Israel Ben-Ezra, Ze'ev Neumann and Asher Segra) withdrew before election day. Shimon Lankri defeated Moshe Davidovich by around 100 votes. he also defeated Aaron Lehiani. Lanrki won 47.1% of the vote, Davidovich won 46.56% of the vote, and Lehiani won 6.33%.

Composition of the City Council

 This is the chance for change (led by Shimon Lankri)  - 3 Seats
 New Acre led by Ze'ev Neumann - 2 Seats
 Al'Mustakabal - 2 Seats
 Al'Ufak Al-Abai - 2 Seats
 Shas - 2 seats
 Labor (led by Moshe Davidovich) - 2 Seats
 Union of Akkoans - 1 Seat
 Our Hopes - 1 Seat
 Destination (led by Aaron Lehiani) - 1 Seat
 Religious Union - Tkuma for Acre - 1 Seat

Likud, Netz (led by Israel Ben-Ezra) Tzalash - Youths for change, Mafdal and a Future for Acre did not cross the city council's electoral threshold.

Pardesiya 
Incumubent mayor since 1972, Yitzhak Yemini was re-elected as mayor, defeating Moshe Odiz. Yemini won 79.63% of the vote, Odiz won 20.37%. No list failed to cross the City Council's electoral threshold.

Composition of the City Council:

 Local List for One Pardesia (led by Yitzhak Yemini) - 4 Seats
 Future - 2 Seats
 Mafdal - 1 Seat
 Likud (led by Moshe Odiz) - 1 Seat
 Tradition - 1 Seat

Petah Tikva 
Incumbent mayor Yitzhak Ohion was re-elected, defeating Rafi Dahan. Ya'akov Felheimer, and Sarah Oren. Ohion won 60.9% of the vote, Dahan won 17.69%, Felheimer won 15.82% and Oren won 5.59%.

Composition of the City Council

 A Peak for Petah Tikva (Shinui, the Greens, and Labor, led by Uri Ahad) - 5 Seats
 One Petah Tikva led by Yitzhak Ohion - 4 Seats
 Shas led by Sinai Gilboa - 3 Seats
 Mafdal led by Faltiel Izental - 3 Seats
 Likud led by Rafi Dahan - 2 Seats
 Yisrael Beitenu led by Gennady Borshovsky - 2 Seats
 The Tribes of Israel Together led by Benny Zahavi and Rabbi Avraham Sabag - 2 Seats
 United Torah Judaism - Agudat Yisrael - Degel HaTorah led by Shlomo Aryeh Korlanski - 1 Seat
 Free City - Meretz led by Sarah Oren - 1 Seat
 One nation led by Sarah Haftal - 1 Seat
 Citizen in the Center led by Ya'akov Felheimer - 1 Seat

Voice of the Citizens, Independent List, For Petah Tikva, the 12 Volunteers, For a Future and the movement for the Forum of Neighborhoods did not cross the City Council's electoral threshold.

Kiryat Malakhi 
Incumbent Mayor Lior Katsav was defeated by Motti Malka. Malka also defeated Yossi Sulimani, Chaim Weizmann, and Avraham (Beber) Azulai. Malka won 58.39% of the vote, Katsav won 13.29, Sulimani won 11.1%, Weizmann won 10.22% and Azulai won 7% of the vote.

Composition of the City Council:

 Likud - Chabad (led by Motti Malka) - 3 Seats
 Unity of Israel - 2 Seats
 Hope for the City Council - 2 Seats
 Loyalists of the Kirya - 2 Seats
 Shas - 2 Seats
 One Nation (led byAvraham Azulai) - 1 Seat
 Labor (led by Yossi Sulimani) - 1 Seat

Another Kiryat Malakhi (led by Chaim Weizmann), One Kiryat Malakhi-Mafdal (led by Lior Katsav), Shield of Kirya and the Revolution did not cross the City Council's Electoral Threshold.

Kiryat Ekron 
Incumbent leader of the Local Council Arik Hadad was defeated by Shuli Suleiman. Suleiman won 54.52% of the vote and Hadad won 45.48%.

Composition of the Local Council:

 One Ekron led by Arik Hadad (supported by Labor) - 3 Seats
 Likud (led by Shuli Suleiman) - 2 Seats
 A Future for Kiryat Ekron - 2 Seats
 Shas - 1 Seat
 Mafdal -1  Seat

All Competing lists crossed the Local Council's electoral threshold.

Rosh Pinna 
Incumbent head of the Local Council since 2000, Avihod Raski, was re-elected, defeating Motti Hattiel and Uzi Blom. Raski won 76.64% of the vote, Hattiel won 17.43% and Blom won 5.93%. Hattiel later became head of the Local Council.

Composition of the Local Council:

 One Rosh Pinna (led by Avihod Raski) - 2 Seats
 Guy Oni (led by Motti hatiel) - 2 Seats
 Women of Rosh Pinna - 2 Seat

Together (led by Uzi Blom) did not cross the Local Council's electoral threshold.

Tel Aviv-Yafo 

Incumbent Mayor Ron Huldai was re-elected after winning around 63% of the vote

Composition of the City Council:

 Power for Retirees - 6 Seats
 Meretz Tel-Aviv Yafo - 5 Seats
 One Tel-Aviv - 4 Seats
 Greens - 4 Seats
 Likud - 3 Seats
 Shas - 3 Seats
 United Torah Judaism and Eli Eminov - 2 Seats
 Shinui - 2 Seats
 Mafdal - 1 Seat
 the Public's right to Know - 1 Seat

After the election was held, all party lists besides Shinui and 'the public's right to know' joined Huldai's governing coalition.

External links 
 Election results - A B C D E F G H I J

Municipal elections in Israel
2003 in Israel
2003 in politics